Karol Mikloš (born 1972) is a Slovak recording artist. A former member of a gothic rock band known as Shellwoy (1992–1993), recorded his own self-titled demo EP in 1994. His full-length debut, The Same Mist Here (1997), saw its official results on Róbert Gregor's Agency – G.A. Records. The guitar-based work made under production by Ladislav Lučenič, spawned a Grammy Slovakia Award-nomination as the New Artist. Its electronic follow-up issued on Millennium Records, Vis-à-vis (2002), became a Best Male Vocal Performance-nominee in favor of local Aurel Awards. While The Past of the Future (2008) with a more acoustic sound, was nominated for so-called Radio Head Awards, for a change. Apart from performing and composing skills for his own, Mikloš has occasionally been involved in production, audio and mastering engineering, mixing and programming for fellow artists.

On the occasion of the 2015 Record Store Day, Mikloš issued his most recent release, "One Life More or Less".

Discography

 Studio albums
 1997: The Same Mist Here
 2002: Vis-à-vis 
 2008: The Past of the Future
 2017: Poisoned EP
 2022: This Side of Town

Awards
Apart from a number of nominations for domestic music awards, all received in response to his album releases, in the Czech Republic The Past of the Future was listed among the Radio Wave's Albums of the Week in June 2008.

See also
 8th ZAI Grammy Slovakia Awards
 2nd Aurel Awards

References

External links
  (Official website)
 Karol Mikloš on Discogs
 
 
 
 
 
 Karol Mikloš at Deadred Records 
 Karol Mikloš at Starcastic Records 

 
1972 births
Living people
20th-century Slovak male singers
21st-century Slovak male singers
Indie pop musicians